The Spy Swatter is a 1967 Warner Bros. Looney Tunes cartoon directed by Rudy Larriva. The short was released on June 24, 1967, and stars Daffy Duck and Speedy Gonzales. This was the final Looney Tunes/Merrie Melodies short to be directed by Rudy Larriva.

Plot
A secret strength formula for mice has been developed, and Speedy is tasked with getting it to the Mouse Factory. Unfortunately, Daffy has been sent by a rival agency to stop him. Daffy uses a variety of inventions to cut the mouse off or nab him, all of which backfire on him, or Speedy outwits him. The final plan, a mouse-seeking missile, is changed by Speedy to a duck-seeking missile; Daffy frantically returns to his base, and it blows up there. Speedy pops in the door and says to Daffy, "I want to tell you a little secret. Us good guys always win!"

Crew
Voice Characterizations: Mel Blanc
Director: Rudy Larriva
Story: Tom Dagenais, Cal Howard
Layout: Don Sheppard
Background: Walt Peregoy
Animation: Ed Friedman, Virgil Ross, Bob Bransford
Film Editor: Joe Siracusa
Music: William Lava
Produced by: William L. Hendricks & Herbert Klynn

See also
List of American films of 1967
 List of Daffy Duck cartoons

References

External links
 
 

1967 films
1967 animated films
1967 short films
Looney Tunes shorts
Warner Bros. Cartoons animated short films
Daffy Duck films
Speedy Gonzales films
Animated films about mice
Animated films about cats
Films scored by William Lava
Format Films short films
1960s Warner Bros. animated short films
1960s English-language films